M4M (Mystical Formula), is a Mandopop boy band formed in 2013 by South Korea's Cube Entertainment and China's Xing Tian Media. The group consists of four members; Alen, Jimmy, Vinson, and Yu Bin. The group debuted on March 13, 2013 on M! Countdown with the Korean version of Sadness. In March 2014, M4M announced that they are going to terminate their contracts with Chinese company Xing Tian Media, due to a lack of activity.

History

Name origin 
M4M is an abbreviation for Mystical Formula. The name is used to describe passion, mystery and infinite possibilities, whilst the number 4 is representational of the number of members in the group.

2009–2012: Formation 
In 2009, Xing Tian Media started to scout four individual talents to make up a new group. Although they were originally due to début before fellow labelmate BtoB, the departure of member and leader Park Jung-jong set back their début until the arrival of Alen.

2013: Début 
In February 2013, Cube Entertainment announced that the group, which had been training for 1,460 days, would be making their début although they didn't specify a date. On 12 March,  they released the single for "Sadness" followed by their formal debut on M! Countdown and the uploading of the single's music video on YouTube on the following day. Two months later, they went on to release their first mini album, the self-titled "Mystery Formula" of which both a Chinese version and a Korean version were released.

2018: Idol Producer 
After a long hiatus, Bin became a trainee for NewStyle Media, and participates in Idol Producer.

Members

Current members 
 Alen (Fang Yilun 方逸伦) - China
 Jimmy (Zhu Zhaofeng 朱兆豐) - Hong Kong
 Vinson (Luo Yusheng 罗宇胜) - Taiwan
 Yubin (于斌) - Macau

Former members 
 Park Jung-jong
Kang Jae-Min

Discography

Extended plays 
 Mystery Formula

Filmography 
 20 Once Again
 A Different Kind of Pretty Man
 Tian Mi Sheng Huo
 Qing Chun Wan Wan Sui

Awards and nominations

References 

Mandopop musical groups
Chinese musical groups
Chinese boy bands
K-pop singers
Cube Entertainment artists
Mandarin-language singers
K-pop music groups
Musical groups established in 2013
Musical quartets
South Korean boy bands
South Korean dance music groups